Emil Gabrovitz (also known 1875  - 1947 in Budapest) was a Hungarian football player. He made his debut and obtained his only cap for the Hungarian national football team on 12 October 1902 against Austria in Vienna. His brother, Kornél Gabrovitz, was also a football defender. His son Emil Gabrovitz was a Hungarian tennis champion.

References

Hungarian footballers
1875 births
1947 deaths
Footballers from Budapest
Association football defenders
Hungary international footballers